"Stayin' Alive" is a song written and performed by the Bee Gees from the Saturday Night Fever motion picture soundtrack. The song was released in 1977 as the second single from the Saturday Night Fever soundtrack. The band co-produced the song with Albhy Galuten and Karl Richardson. It is one of the Bee Gees' signature songs. In 2004, "Stayin' Alive" was placed at No. 189 on the list of Rolling Stone's 500 Greatest Songs of All Time. The 2021 updated Rolling Stone list of 500 Greatest Songs placed "Stayin' Alive" at No. 99. In 2004, it ranked No. 9 on AFI's 100 Years...100 Songs survey of top tunes in American cinema. In a UK television poll on ITV in December 2011 it was voted fifth in "The Nation's Favourite Bee Gees Song".

On its release, "Stayin' Alive" climbed the charts to hit the number one spot on the Billboard Hot 100 the week of 4 February 1978, remaining there for four consecutive weeks. Consequently, it became one of the band's most recognisable tunes, partly because it appeared in the opening credits of Saturday Night Fever. In the United States, it would become the second of six consecutive number-one singles, tying the record with the Beatles for most consecutive number ones in the United States at the time (a record broken by Whitney Houston who achieved seven consecutive number-ones).

Writing and recording
The executive producer of the Saturday Night Fever motion picture soundtrack and Bee Gees manager Robert Stigwood asked the band to write a few songs for the soundtrack. At this point, the film was in early stages and it did not have a title; in fact, all Stigwood had to go on was a New York cover story about discomania.

They wrote "Stayin' Alive" over the course of a few days while sprawled on the staircase at the Château d'Hérouville studio near Paris. As with many other artists during the 1970s, the Bee Gees recorded most of the soundtrack in France for tax reasons.

RSO Records wanted the song to share the then-title of the film, "Saturday Night", but the Bee Gees refused a title change, insisting that there had been too many songs with "Saturday" in the title, and the album already had a song with the word "night" in the title—"Night Fever". Rather than change the name of the former song to match the film, Stigwood expanded the name of the film to encompass the title of the latter song. Over the years, the brothers have had mixed feelings about the song, admitting it brought them tremendous fame but conversely branded them as a disco act, despite a long and varied career before and after.

Several words from Robin Gibb's Concorde ticket inspired the Gibbs to write the lyrics for "Stayin' Alive". Robin recalls, "The subject matter of 'Stayin' Alive' is actually quite a serious one; It's about survival in the streets of New York, and the lyrics actually say that". Barry Gibb also recalls, "People crying out for help. Desperate songs. Those are the ones that become giants. The minute you capture that on record, it's gold. 'Stayin' Alive' is the epitome of that. Everybody struggles against the world, fighting all the bullshit and things that can drag you down. And it really is a victory just to survive. But when you climb back on top and win bigger than ever before, well that's something everybody reacts to everybody". "We'd also written a song called 'Saturday Night'", Maurice explains, "But there were so many songs called 'Saturday Night' even one by the Bay City Rollers, so when we rewrote it for the movie, we called it 'Stayin' Alive'.

The track was finished at Criteria Studios, with Maurice Gibb laying down a bass line similar to the guitar riff, Barry Gibb and Alan Kendall on guitar riffs, and Blue Weaver adding synthesizers. The Boneroo Horns parts were added. Barry sings falsetto on the whole song, except on the line "life's going nowhere, somebody help me".

The band's drummer Dennis Bryon left the recording sessions early due to the death of his mother, and the group first looked for a replacement. The shortage of qualified drummers in the area prompted the group to try a drum machine, but it did not offer satisfactory results. After listening to the drum track of the already-recorded "Night Fever", the group and producer Albhy Galuten took two bars from that track, rerecorded them as a recurrent loop on a separate tape (creating the song's constant rhythm), and proceeded with sessions for "Stayin' Alive". The group jokingly listed the drummer as "Bernard Lupe" (a takeoff on session drummer Bernard Purdie). Lupe became a highly sought-after drummer—until it was discovered that he did not exist.

Albhy Galuten talks about the recording of "Stayin' Alive":

In their work together, Gibb and Galuten had tried playing with a click track as Galuten explained:

Release

The song was not initially scheduled for release, with "How Deep Is Your Love" selected as lead single, but fans called radio stations and RSO Records requesting the song immediately after seeing trailers for Saturday Night Fever, featuring the track over the aforementioned introductory scene. The single was eventually released in mid-December, a month after the album, and moved to the top of the Billboard Hot 100 in the United States in February, where it stayed for four weeks. Soon after, it slid to number two, near the third hit from the album, "Night Fever". In the United Kingdom, "Stayin' Alive" was not as popular as it was in the United States, but was still a hit, reaching number four.

Further demonstrating the Bee Gees' US chart domination in 1978, "Stayin' Alive" was replaced at number one with the group's younger brother Andy Gibb's single, "Love Is Thicker Than Water", followed by the Bee Gees' "Night Fever" for their longest run, eight weeks. This was then replaced by Yvonne Elliman's "If I Can't Have You". Barry Gibb had a hand in writing all four of these songs, becoming the only person in history to write four successive US number-one singles. Besides the version that appeared on the soundtrack album (4:43 in length) and the edited 45RPM single for Top 40 radio release (3:29), there was yet another version, from the same recording session but of a slightly different mix, that was distributed on twelve-inch vinyl to club DJs and radio stations that specialised in airing longer versions of hit songs. This "Special Disco Version" featured all the same parts as the album version but had a horn rhythm section interjected twice. Although twelve-inch disco mixes were usually sped up, this version was slowed down slightly. It is the longest version of "Stayin' Alive" ever made, and faded at 6:59. It was finally released on CD in 2007 by Reprise on an expanded and remastered version of Bee Gees Greatest.

Initial plans were for Yvonne Elliman, then known for ballads, to record "How Deep Is Your Love" for Saturday Night Fever, while the Bee Gees produced their own version of the more disco-oriented "If I Can't Have You" for the film. Robert Stigwood thought he would prefer the songs from different genders and directed the group to cut the ballad, while Elliman cut "If I Can't Have You" with her usual producer Freddie Perren. Satisfied with this switch, Elliman's interpretation made the soundtrack, while the Bee Gees' version was relegated to the B-side of the "Stayin' Alive" single. The brothers' version has since appeared on CD in hits compilations.

George Martin commented about this song saying: "The great thing about 'Stayin' Alive' is that it had a great guitar hook to start with which set up the theme, that pulsating beat. It's no coincidence, by the way, that the disco beat of 120 beats per minute coincides the heartbeat of your heart when you're excited. This was a key thing which underlined the whole tune, and when the vocals came in, the vocals were so designed that they pushed that beat further".

Billboard reviewed the single calling it one of the Bee Gees best songs and an "almost irresistible dance tune." Cash Box said that it "combines catchy melodies, falsetto harmonies and a dancing beat in a package that will lead to big pop and R&B chart numbers."  Record World called it "a pulsing, rather ominous dance tune."

Music video
The accompanying music video for the song is of an entirely different concept from Saturday Night Fever. Filmed on MGM Studios' backlot #2 in Culver City, California, while the group was simultaneously filming the movie Sgt. Pepper's Lonely Hearts Club Band on the lot, the video featured Quality Street (a set that was used for such films as The Three Musketeers and Young Frankenstein) as well as the Grand Central Station set used in the films The Band Wagon and the opening of That's Entertainment! with Fred Astaire. As the group walks past one of the railway cars in the video, the words "New York Central" can be seen printed on the side of the train above a passenger window. The MGM art directors added this bit of authenticity because the actual New York Central Railroad operated several lines from Grand Central Terminal in New York City during the 20th century until 1969.

Personnel
Credits.
Barry Gibb – lead and harmony vocals, rhythm guitar
Robin Gibb – lead and harmony vocals
Maurice Gibb – harmony and backing vocals, bass
Alan Kendall – lead guitar
Blue Weaver – keyboards
Dennis Bryon (Bernard Lupe) – drums
Joe Lala – timbales

Track listing
"Stayin' Alive" – 3:29
"If I Can't Have You" – 3:25

1989 reissue
"Stayin' Alive" - 4:45
"Subway" – 4:20
"Love So Right" – 3:33

Use in medical training
"Stayin' Alive" was used in a study to train medical professionals to provide the correct number of chest compressions per minute while performing CPR. The song has around 103 beats per minute, and 100–120 chest compressions per minute are recommended by the British Heart Foundation and endorsed by the Resuscitation Council (UK). A study on medical professionals found that the quality of CPR is better when thinking of the song "Stayin' Alive". This was parodied in the Season 5 episode of comedy series The Office "Stress Relief" and the song itself was used in a season 11 episode of the medical drama Grey's Anatomy in 2015.

On 15 June 2011, the song was featured in a Hands Only CPR PSA campaign video from the American Heart Association and featured actor and medical doctor Ken Jeong in the classic John Travolta outfit from Saturday Night Fever. Vinnie Jones starred in the British version of this CPR video in association with the British Heart Foundation shown on TV in January 2012.

Accolades

(*) indicates the list is unordered.

Charts

Weekly charts

Year-end charts

All-time charts

Certifications and sales

N-Trance version

In 1995, British electronic music group N-Trance recorded a dance version of the song, with new lyrics and rapping by Ricardo da Force. This cover was released as the third single from the group's debut album, Electronic Pleasure (1995). It reached number one on Australia's ARIA Singles Chart and Canada's RPM Dance/Urban chart. The song was also a major hit in Europe, reaching number two in Finland, Iceland, Italy, Switzerland, and the United Kingdom, and reached the top 5 in several other countries. On the Eurochart Hot 100, "Stayin' Alive '95" peaked at number three.

Critical reception
Larry Flick from Billboard commented, "U.K. import enthusiasts are already aware of this jumpy rap interpretation of the Bee Gees disco classic. Early radio reaction holds promise for a quick and successful ride up the Hot 100. There is not a whole lot of substance in TLK's rap [sic], but he certainly has a rousing, infectious style that makes the track spark. Singer Kelly Llorenna injects some bright diva flash during the bridge and chorus." James Masterton for Dotmusic stated that N-Trance "take the song into a whole new dimension". He added, "This is no ordinary cover, this is a fantastic reinterpretation that only the bold would bet against being Number One next week."

Ross Jones from The Guardian complimented the group's "knack for ingenious disco updates". A reviewer from Music Week rated the song three out of five, saying that rapper da Force "takes the mic for this radical reworking of the Bee Gees classic which isn't Euro enough to grab the same audience as their recent international hit Set You Free". James Hamilton from the magazine's RM Dance Update described it as a "jiggly rolling 0-106.4bpm chugger".

Chart performance
N-Trance's cover of "Stayin' Alive" peaked at number one in Australia and on the RPM Dance/Urban chart in Canada. In Europe, it peaked at number one in Scotland and reached number two in Finland, Iceland, Italy, Switzerland, and the UK. In the latter nation, the single peaked during its first week on the UK Singles Chart, on September 10, 1995. It also reached number-one on the RM UK on a Pop Tip Club Chart. It additionally made it to the top 10 also in Austria, Belgium, Denmark, Germany, Ireland, Norway, Spain, and Sweden, as well as on the Eurochart Hot 100, where it rose to number three.

Outside Europe, "Stayin' Alive '95" went to number three in New Zealand, number nine on the Billboard Hot Dance Music/Maxi-Singles Sales in the United States, number 56 on the RPM Top Singles chart in Canada, and number 62 on the Billboard Hot 100. The single earned a gold record in France and Germany, a silver record in the UK, a platinum record in New Zealand, and a double-platinum record in Australia.

Music videos
A music video was made for "Stayin Alive '95", directed by British director Alex De Rakoff.

Track listing

Charts

Weekly charts

Year-end charts

Decade-end charts

Certifications

Stayin' Alive (Serban Mix)

On 10 February 2017, Capitol Records released a new version of the song entitled "Stayin' Alive" (Serban mix). The song was mixed by Şerban Ghenea from "hi-resolution audio files" from the original recording session of "Stayin' Alive", and it was mastered by Tom Coyne. The single was released in commemoration of the 40th anniversary of the Saturday Night Fever (1977) soundtrack.

Track listing
Digital download
"Stayin' Alive (Serban mix)" – 4:57

Other media
The song is used in the 1980 comedy film Airplane!. During a bar-room fight, the song accidentally starts playing on a jukebox, turning the scene into a parody of Saturday Night Fever. Zucker, Abrahams and Zucker sped the track up by 10% in the film, and had to get permission from the Gibb brothers to do so.

In the BBC show Sherlock, as a ringtone of Jim Moriarty, in its series two premiere on New Year's Day, 2012. It is also heard in the series two finale, when Moriarty tells Sherlock that their final problem is 'Stayin' Alive', whilst playing the song on his phone.

A Japanese-language cover version by Avu-chan appeared on the soundtrack to the Bullet Train 2022 film.

See also
List of number-one singles in Australia during the 1970s
List of Billboard Hot 100 number-one singles of 1978
List of Cash Box Top 100 number-one singles of 1978
List of Dutch Top 40 number-one singles of 1978
List of European number-one hits of 1978
List of number-one hits of 1978 (Italy)
List of number-one singles of 1978 (Canada)
List of number-one singles of 1978 (France)
List of number-one hits of 1978 (Mexico)
List of number-one singles in 1978 (New Zealand)
Rolling Stone's 500 Greatest Songs of All Time
Statue of Bee Gees (Douglas, Isle of Man), inspired by the song's music video

References

External links
Bee Gees Stayin' Alive Fansite
Stayin' Alive – The Story Behind the Song at Wow-Vinyl

1977 songs
1977 singles
1978 singles
1995 singles
Bee Gees songs
British disco songs
All Around the World Productions singles
Capitol Records singles
Billboard Hot 100 number-one singles
Cashbox number-one singles
Dutch Top 40 number-one singles
European Hot 100 Singles number-one singles
Grammy Award for Best Vocal Arrangement for Two or More Voices
Jo Stafford songs
Music videos directed by Bruce Gowers
N-Trance songs
Number-one singles in Australia
Number-one singles in Italy
Number-one singles in Mexico
Number-one singles in Scotland
Number-one singles in South Africa
Number-one singles in New Zealand
RPM Top Singles number-one singles
RSO Records singles
Song recordings produced by Albhy Galuten
Songs from Saturday Night Fever
Songs written by Barry Gibb
Songs written by Maurice Gibb
Songs written by Robin Gibb
Songs written for films
Film theme songs